  

GE Ventures (founded in 2013) is the venture capital subsidiary of General Electric. Headquartered in Menlo Park, California the firm also has offices in Boston, Chicago, Houston, Shanghai, and Tel Aviv. As of 2015, the CEO is Sue Siegel, and on October 23, 2017, she was also named chief innovation officer. GE Ventures plans to invest up to $150 million annually in startups (or corporate collaborations) in the healthcare, energy, software, and advanced manufacturing sectors.

The firm lists 75 companies in its portfolio, including Clearpath Robotics, HourlyNerd, Mocana, Nanosonics, Enbala, and Airware.  In March 2015, GE Ventures led a Series A investment in Evidation Health, a healthcare technology company formerly known as The Activity Exchange that is involved in data analytics. In December 2016, GE Ventures launched Menlo Microsystems, Inc., a spinoff from GE's Global Research Center, which creates "digital micro switches" used in mobile communication networks.

See also  
 List of venture capital firms

References

Notes

External links
 GE Ventures Website

General Electric subsidiaries
Financial services companies established in 2013
Venture capital firms of the United States
Companies based in Menlo Park, California